Bukadaban Feng or Buka Daban Feng, Syn Qing Feng or Bokalik Tagh, is a remote peak on the border between Ruoqiang County, Xinjiang and Qinghai provinces of China. The Chinese term 'Bukadaban Feng' is borrowed from the Uyghur for "bison peak". It is part of the Kunlun Mountains of East-Central Asia. The peak is considered part of Hoh Xil.

References

See also
 List of Ultras of Tibet, East Asia and neighbouring areas

Highest points of Chinese provinces
Mountains of Xinjiang
Landforms of Qinghai